VMware Workstation Player, formerly VMware Player, is a virtualization software package for x64 computers running Microsoft Windows or Linux, supplied free of charge by VMware, Inc. VMware Player can run existing virtual appliances and create its own virtual machines (which require that an operating system be installed to be functional). It uses the same virtualization core as VMware Workstation, a similar program with more features, which is not free of charge. VMware Player is available for personal non-commercial use, or for distribution or other use by written agreement. VMware, Inc. does not formally support Player, but there is an active community website for discussing and resolving issues, as well as a knowledge base.

The free VMware Player was distinct from VMware Workstation until Player v7, Workstation v11. In 2015 the two packages were combined as VMware Workstation 12, with a free for non-commercial use Player version which, on purchase of a license code, either became the higher-specification VMware Workstation Pro, or allowed commercial use of Player.

Features
VMware claimed in 2011 that the Player offered better graphics, faster performance, and tighter integration for running Windows XP under Windows Vista or Windows 7 than Microsoft's Windows XP Mode running on Windows Virtual PC, which is free of charge for all purposes.

Versions earlier than 3 of VMware Player were unable to create virtual machines (VMs), which had to be created by an application with the capability, or created manually by statements stored in a text file with extension ".vmx"; later versions can create VMs. The features of Workstation not available in Player are "developer-centric features such as Teams, multiple Snapshots and Clones, and Virtual Rights Management features for end-point security", and support by VMware. Player allows a complete virtual machine to be copied at any time by copying a directory; while not a fully featured snapshot facility, this allows a copy of a machine in a particular state to be stored, and reverted to later if desired. By default changes (including proxy settings, passwords, bookmarks, installed software and malware) made in a VM are saved when it is shut down, but the .vmx configuration file can easily be edited to autorevert on shutdown, so that all changes are discarded.

VMware Player is also supplied with the VMware Workstation distribution, for use in installations where not all client users are licensed to use the full VMware Workstation. In an environment where some machines without VMware Workstation licences run VMware Player, a virtual machine created by Workstation can be distributed to computers running Player without paying for additional Workstation licenses if not used commercially.

Version history

Resources

Many ready-made virtual machines (VMs) which run on VMware Player, Workstation, and other virtualization software are available for specific purposes, either for purchase or free of charge. For example, a free Linux-based “browser appliance” with the Firefox browser installed is available that can be used for safe Web browsing; if infected or damaged, it can be discarded and replaced by a clean copy. VMs can be configured to reset after each use without the need to recreate from the original file. Suppliers of operating systems with commercial licences usually require installations to be licensed; VMs with such operating systems installed cannot be distributed without restriction. Ready-to-use VMs with Microsoft or Apple operating systems installed, in particular, are not distributed, except for evaluation versions.

VMware Player supports free-of-charge VMware Tools, which add significant functionality. Versions of Player for different platforms have their own Tools, not necessarily compatible with other versions. Sometimes Tools are updated belatedly; for example, Player 4.0.2 was released on 24 January 2012, but the corresponding version of Tools was not available for some time after that, restricting functionality of updated Player installations.

Virtual machines created by one VMware software product can be used by any other. It is often possible to use VMs created by one manufacturer's virtual machine software with software from another manufacturer, either directly or via a conversion procedure. VMs that run on Microsoft Virtual Server and Virtual PC can be converted for use by VMware software by the VMware vCenter Converter. This software can also create a virtual machine from a physical PC.

See also
 Comparison of platform virtualization software

References

External links
 
 Open Virtual Machine Tools
 File Extension VMX
 V3.co.uk Review of VMware Player 3.1.2

Player
Virtualization software
Proprietary cross-platform software